Sverdlovsk Film Studio is a Russian film studio based in Yekaterinburg (formerly Sverdlovsk). It is a regional studio, that was established on 9 February 1943 in the midst of World War II. In 1944 the studio produced its first film, Silva,  a musical comedy based on the Austrian operetta Sylva.

In 1998, Sverdlovsk Film Studio almost went bankrupt. This was resolved with help from the state, a new management team and independent producers. Between 2003 and 2008, aerial cinematography was used to create projects such as  First on the Moon. Other projects were The Admiral and the theatrical film, co-produced by Sverdlovsk Film Studio, The House of the Sun.

Feature films
2020. Beginning – 2012
 – 2012
 – 2012
 – 2010

The Golden Snake – 2007
 – 2005
 – 2005
 – 2001
 – 2001
 – 1996
 – 1993
 – 1993
 – 1991
 – 1989
 – 1989
 – 1989
 – 1986
 – 1986
 – 1985
 – 1985
 – 1983
 – 1983
 – 1983
 – 1982
 – 1981
 – 1980
 – 1979
 – 1972
 – 1969
 – 1968
 – 1965
 – 1963
 – 1963
 – 1958

Animated features

The Pink Doll – 1997
 – 1986
 – 1985

References

External links
Sverdlovsk Film Studios official website 
Sverdlovsk Film Studios English version – About Company
List of films produced by Sverdlovsk Film Studio at Kinopoisk.ru
IMDB – companies – Sverdlovsk Film Studios (incomplete)
Complete list of animated films of Sverdlovsk Film Studio at animator.ru
Complete list of films of Sverdlovsk Animation Studio 'A-Film' at animator.ru

Russian film studios
Film production companies of the Soviet Union
Film production companies of Russia
Russian brands
1943 establishments in the Soviet Union
Companies based in Yekaterinburg
Mass media companies established in 1943